Don McDougall or McDougal may refer to:

 Donnie McDougall (born 1948), guitarist for The Guess Who
 Don McDougall (director) (1917–1991), American television director
 Donald McDougal, Canadian politician representing Ottawa—Vanier 1908–1911
 Donald MacDougall (1912–2004), British economist
 Don McDougall (baseball) (born 1937), baseball businessman

See also
Don MacDougall, American sound engineer